Armando Romero Gil (born 27 August 1949) is a Mexican equestrian. He competed in two events at the 1984 Summer Olympics.

Notes

References

External links
 
 

1949 births
Living people
Mexican male equestrians
Olympic equestrians of Mexico
Equestrians at the 1984 Summer Olympics
Place of birth missing (living people)